William Andrew Smith (1802–1870) was an American college president and clergyman.

Life and career 
William Andrew Smith was born on November 29, 1802, in Fredericksburg, Virginia, to William & Mary (Porter) Smith. William Andrew's mother died of illness in 1804 and his father was killed by business associates in 1813.

Smith was a preacher for the Methodist Episcopal Church, being admitted on trial in 1825 and becoming a full preacher in 1827. Smith was elected to be president of Randolph–Macon College in Ashland, Virginia in 1846. He was also a professor of moral and intellectual philosophy at the college. Smith was proslavery and published a series of lectures titled "Lectures on the Philosophy and Practice of Slavery, as Exhibited in the Institution of Domestic Slavery in the United States: with the Duties of Masters to Slaves" in 1856. In 1866, Smith resigned from his position as president. He went on to become the pastor of Centenary Church in St. Louis, Missouri. In 1868, Smith was selected to be the fifth president of Central College (now Central Methodist University) in Fayette, Missouri, as it resumed operations after the American Civil War.

Smith died on March 1, 1870, in Richmond, Virginia.

References 

1802 births
1870 deaths
People from Fredericksburg, Virginia
American Methodist clergy
Members of the Methodist Episcopal Church
19th-century American educators
Randolph–Macon College faculty
Educators from Virginia
Heads of universities and colleges in the United States
Central Methodist University
19th-century Methodists
19th-century American clergy